Harald Motzki (1948–2019) was a German-trained Islamic scholar who wrote on the transmission of hadith. He received his PhD in Islamic Studies in 1978 from the University of Bonn. He was Professor of Islamic Studies at Nijmegen University (Radboud Universitet Nijmegen) in the Netherlands.

Motzki has been called by fellow scholar of Islam, Christopher Melchert, "the undisputed dean of hadith studies".

Motzki died on February 8, 2019.

See also
Islamic scholars
History of Hadith

References

Bibliography
Analyzing Muslim Traditions: Studies in Legal, Exegetical and Maghazi Hadith (2009) [with Nicolet Boekhoff-van der Voort and Sean W. Anthony)
Hadith: Origins and Developments (2004) 
The Origins of Islamic Jurisprudence (2002) [with Marion H. Katz] 
The Biography of Muhammad: The Issue of the Sources (2000), Brill Academic Pub.

Festschrifts
The Transmission and Dynamics of the Textual Sources of Islam: Essays in Honor of Harald Motzki, Brill Academic Pub.

Dutch Islamic studies scholars
Hadith scholars
Scholars of Islamic jurisprudence
1948 births
2019 deaths